The Thadingyut Festival, also known as the Lighting Festival of Myanmar, is held on the full moon day of the Burmese lunar month of Thadingyut. As a custom, it is held at the end of the Buddhist sabbath (Vassa) and is the second most popular festival in Myanmar after Thingyan Festival (New Year Water Festival). Thadingyut festival is the celebration to welcome the Buddha’s descent from the heaven after he preached the Abhidhamma to his mother, Maya, who was reborn in the heaven.

Origins
Thadingyut, the seventh month of the Myanmar calendar, is the end of the Buddhist sabbath or Vassa. Thadingyut festival lasts for three days: the day before the full moon day, the full moon day (when Buddha descends from heaven) and the day after the full moon day. Buddha's mother, Maya, died seven days after the Buddha was born and then she was reborn in the Trayastrimsa Heaven as a male .

In order to show the gratitude for motherhood, Buddha preached Abhidhamma to that deva who was his mother for three Lenten months. When he was descending back to the mortal world, Sakra-devanam-indra, the ruler of the Trayastrimsa Heaven, ordered all the saints and evils to make three precious stairways. Those stairways were made of gold, silver and ruby. The Buddha took the middle one with the ruby. The Nats (Deva) came along by the right golden stairways and the Brahmas from the left silver stairways.

Celebrations

Buddhists celebrate Thadingyut to welcome the Buddha and his disciples by enlightening and festooning the streets, houses and public buildings with colored electric bulbs or candles, which represent those three stairways. During Thadingyut Festival, there are zat pwes (Myanmar musical plays), free movie shows and stage shows on most of the streets around the country. There are also a lot of food stalls, which sell a variety of Myanmar traditional foods and shops, which sell toys, kitchen utensils, and other useful stuff on most of the streets. Sometime people just walk around in those streets just for sightseeing and have fun. Some people like to play with firecrackers and fire balloons. 

During the festival days, Buddhists usually go to pagodas and monasteries to pay homage to Triple Gems, paying respect to the monks and offer foods. And some Buddhists usually fast on the full moon day. Young people usually pay respect (gadaw) to their parents, teachers, and elderly relative and offer them some fruits and other gifts. Also while paying homage the younger people usually ask for forgiveness from the wrong-doings they have caused upon their parents or the other elderly relatives throughout the year. Traditionally the elders tell their youngsters that they forgive any of their wrongdoings and continue to bless them with good luck and gift some big notes as pocket money. It is also usual for younger siblings to pay homage to their older siblings. In return, the elder ones wish good luck for them and give them some pocket money.

Regional traditions
Dawei - Dawei locals hold a thabeik hmyaw pwe (သပိတ်မျှောပွဲ), in which alms bowls filled with offertories (e.g., flowers, water, oil lamps, candles and joss-sticks) are set adrift at sea to Shin Upagutta.
Shwegyin - Shwegyin locals hold a mi hmyaw pwe (မီးမျှောပွဲ), in which colorful oil lanterns are set adrift into the Shwegyin River to Shin Upagutta. The tradition dates back to the Konbaung dynasty, established in 1851 (BE 1375).

See also

Gadaw
Kathina
Pavarana
Uposatha
Tazaungdaing Festival
Wan Ok Phansa, its equivalent in Thailand
Ubon Ratchathani Candle Festival
Vessantara Festival

References

Buddhist festivals in Myanmar
Buddhist holidays
Festivals in Myanmar
Observances set by the Burmese calendar
Observances held on the full moon